Limestone Valley is a valley extending northwest from Cemetery Bay, Signy Island, in the South Orkney Islands. The valley leads directly to Jane Col and serves as a route to the west coast of the island. It was so named by the UK Antarctic Place-Names Committee because of an exposure of limestone in the cliff above the valley.

References

Valleys of Antarctica